Belobranchus is a small genus of Eleotrid sleeper gobies from south-east Asia, New Guinea and the western Pacific.

Species
The genus was considered to be a monotypic taxon until the description of Belobranchus segura in 2012. The two species in the genus are:

 Belobranchus belobranchus  (Valenciennes, 1837) 
 Belobranchus segura Keith, Hadiaty & Lord, 2012

References

Eleotridae